Rockport Air Force Station (ADC ID: TM-191) is a closed United States Air Force General Surveillance Radar station. It was closed in 1963.

History
Rockport Air Force Station came into existence as part of Phase III of the Air Defense Command Mobile Radar program. On October 20, 1953 ADC requested a third phase of twenty-five radar sites be constructed.

The 813th Aircraft Control and Warning Squadron was assigned on 1 July  1958.  It operated an AN/FPS-3 search radar and an AN/FPS-6 height-finder radar at the site. The station functioned as a Ground-Control Intercept (GCI) and warning station.  As a GCI station, the squadron's role was to guide interceptor aircraft toward unidentified intruders picked up on the unit's radar scopes.

In addition to the main facility, Rockport operated three AN/FPS-18 Gap Filler sites:
 Riviera, TX      (TM-191A): 
 Palacios, TX     (TM-191B): 
 Delmita, TX      (TM-191C): 

The Air Force inactivated Rockport AFS on 1 August 1963 due to budgetary constraints.  Today, not much of the station remains.   A few buildings,  some disconnected streets in poor repair and most of the area is overgrown grass adjacent to the Aransas County Airport is all that remains.  The nearby Air Force housing area remains intact, long-ago sold off and being used as single-family housing.

Air Force units and assignments

Units
 Constituted as the 813th Aircraft Control and Warning Squadron
 Activated on 18 December 1956 at Oklahoma City AFS, OK (not equipped or manned)
 Moved to Rockport AFS on assigned 1 July 1958
 Discontinued and inactivated on 1 August 1963

Assignments
 33d Air Division, 1 January 1958
 Oklahoma City Air Defense Sector, 1 Jan 1960
 4752d Air Defense Wing, 1 September 1961
 Oklahoma City Air Defense Sector 25 July 1963 - 1 August 1963

See also
 List of USAF Aerospace Defense Command General Surveillance Radar Stations

References

 Cornett, Lloyd H. and Johnson, Mildred W., A Handbook of Aerospace Defense Organization  1946 - 1980,  Office of History, Aerospace Defense Center, Peterson AFB, CO (1980)
 Winkler, David F. & Webster, Julie L., Searching the Skies, The Legacy of the United States Cold War Defense Radar Program,  US Army Construction Engineering Research Laboratories, Champaign, IL (1997).
 Information for Rockport AFS, TX

Radar stations of the United States Air Force
Installations of the United States Air Force in Texas
Aerospace Defense Command military installations
1959 establishments in Texas
1963 disestablishments in Texas
Military installations established in 1959
Military installations closed in 1963